Howard Hesseman (February 27, 1940 – January 29, 2022) was an American actor known for his television roles as burned-out disc jockey Dr. Johnny Fever on WKRP in Cincinnati, and the lead role of history teacher Charlie Moore on Head of the Class. He appeared regularly on television and in film from the 1970s to 2010s, with other noteworthy roles including Sam Royer (the husband of lead character Ann Romano) in the last two seasons of One Day at a Time, and a supporting role as Captain Pete Lassard in the film Police Academy 2: Their First Assignment.

Early life
Hesseman was born in Lebanon, Oregon, on February 27, 1940. His parents divorced when he was five, and he was raised by his mother and stepfather, a police officer. He graduated from Silverton High School in 1958. Hesseman attended the University of Oregon, and was later a founding member of the San Francisco-based improvisational comedy troupe The Committee with fellow actor David Ogden Stiers. Early in his acting career, he used the alias Don Sturdy, the name he also used as a radio DJ on underground FM station KMPX in San Francisco in the late 1960s.

Career
Under the alias of Don Sturdy, Hesseman made his first television appearances, including the episode "Public Affairs: DR-07" of the show Dragnet in 1968. He portrayed a hippie named Jesse Chaplin, the editor of an underground newspaper. In this Dragnet episode, his character was a panelist on a TV show opposite Sgt. Friday and Officer Gannon.

He played a bit part in two final-season episodes of The Andy Griffith Show. In the episode "Sam for Town Council," Hesseman has an exchange with Emmett Clark (Paul Hartman), who is running for town council against Sam Jones played by Ken Berry. Hesseman plays a character named Harry seen preparing fishing tackle outside a sporting goods store and complaining to Emmett how poor the fishing has been at a nearby fishing spot. Emmett promises to stock the pond with big perch in exchange for Harry's vote. Harry agrees and wears a campaign button supporting Emmett in the race. In the episode "Goober Goes to an Auto Show,” Hesseman, also credited as Don Sturdy, plays the Counterboy, serving hot dogs and root beers to Goober and his old trade school rival Roy Swanson, played by Noam Pitlik.

On July 18, 1969, he appeared with the improv comedy group The Committee in several sketches on The Dick Cavett Show, including one sketch with guest Janis Joplin. Hesseman also appeared in a number of skits as part of The Committee in the 1971 classic film Billy Jack.

Hesseman made several appearances as Mr. Plager, a member of the group therapy ensemble on The Bob Newhart Show, and later in the series was revealed to be gay. He became a playwright in the sixth season of the show, writing a play about the characters in the group. In several other episodes of the show, Hesseman's voice can be heard as a TV announcer.

Hesseman is best known for his role as anti-disco disc jockey John "Dr. Johnny Fever" Caravella on the television sitcom WKRP in Cincinnati from 1978 to 1982, a role Hesseman prepared for by working as a DJ in San Francisco at KMPX-FM for several months. He was nominated for a Primetime Emmy Award for Outstanding Supporting Actor in a Comedy Series in 1980 and 1981 for his portrayal of Fever. He reprised the role of Caravella in nine episodes of The New WKRP in Cincinnati, and also directed several episodes of the 1991-93 series revival. 

He portrayed Sam Royer, the man who married Ann Romano (Bonnie Franklin) on One Day at a Time from 1982 to 1984.

In 1986, he was in the Disney film Flight of the Navigator.

Hesseman played teacher Charlie Moore on the ABC series Head of the Class for four seasons from 1986 to 1990. 

In 1994, Hesseman introduced lost footage of Janis Joplin in a documentary on  Woodstock. He made three appearances on Saturday Night Live: one in which he paid tribute to, and told jokes about, the recently deceased John Belushi and the other in which NBC showed a picture of U.S. president Ronald Reagan, which Hesseman mooned off-camera. He also encouraged the viewing audience to moon the picture and send pictures in to NBC. In 1995, Hesseman played the role of the Marquis de Sade in Quills at the Geffen Playhouse in Westwood, California, which included one scene in which he was fully naked. In 2001, Hesseman had a role on three episodes of That '70s Show. 

In 2006, he played the unorthodox Judge Robert Thompson in three episodes of  Boston Legal, and also appeared in an episode of House. During his appearance as Judge Thompson, Hesseman paid homage to his role as a teacher in his earlier ABC series by hearing a court case while sitting atop the judge's bench, just as the character of Mr. Moore taught his class atop his desk. In 2007, he played The Chemist on HBO's John From Cincinnati. He guest-starred as an announcer at a horse track on Psych, in the episode "And Down the Stretch Comes Murder.” Hesseman guest-starred on the 2007 season premiere of NBC's ER, playing a man tripping on magic mushrooms who may or may not have been an orthopedist from another hospital. Hesseman starred in The Sunshine Boys at the New Theatre Restaurant in Overland Park, Kansas, from September to November 2010. In February 2011, he portrayed Dr. Elliot D. Aden in the eleventh season CSI: Crime Scene Investigation episode "Turn On, Tune In, Drop Dead.” Dr. Aden was head of Department of Defense project called Stonewall at W.L.V.U., which did research in fringe psychological concepts such as E.S.P. and out-of-body experiences.

Death
Hesseman died from complications of colorectal surgery in Los Angeles, California, on January 29, 2022, at age 81. He is survived by his wife of 33 years, actress Caroline Ducrocq. He was previously married to Cаtherine Mаison (1965–1974).

Filmography

Film

Television

References

External links
 
 
 

1940 births
2022 deaths
20th-century American male actors
21st-century American male actors
American male film actors
American male television actors
American male voice actors
People from Lebanon, Oregon
Male actors from Oregon
University of Oregon alumni